The Adams River is in the South Island of New Zealand.  The headwaters are on the western side of the Southern Alps.  It flows into the Wanganui River.

Westland District
Rivers of the West Coast, New Zealand
Rivers of New Zealand